John William Daly (June 8, 1933 – March 5, 2008) was an American biochemist who performed research for nearly 50 years at the National Institutes of Health in Bethesda, Maryland. A primary focus of his research included the discovery, structure elucidation, synthesis, and pharmacology of alkaloids and other biologically active natural products. He was the world's leading authority in amphibian alkaloids and an expert in many areas of natural products. Daly was a prolific writer, producing around 700 papers, including books and chapters. In 1997 he was elected to the U.S. National Academy of Sciences.

References

1933 births
2008 deaths
Scientists from Portland, Oregon
Deaths from pancreatic cancer
American biochemists
Members of the United States National Academy of Sciences
National Institutes of Health faculty